In mathematics, the Bergman–Weil formula is an integral representation for holomorphic functions of several variables generalizing the Cauchy integral formula.

Weil domains

A Weil domain  is an analytic polyhedron with a domain U in Cn defined by inequalities fj(z) < 1
for functions fj that are holomorphic on some neighborhood of the closure of U, such that  the faces of the Weil domain (where one of the functions is 1 and the others are less than 1)  all have dimension 2n − 1, and the intersections of k faces  have codimension at least k.

See also

Andreotti–Norguet formula
Bochner–Martinelli formula

References

.

.

Theorems in complex analysis
Several complex variables